Jalluru is a village in the Kakinada district of Andhra Pradesh, India.  It is part of Pithapuram Mandal, though it was once part of Pithapuram Estate.

References

Villages in Kakinada district